Nowa Wola Niechcicka  is a village in the administrative district of Gmina Rozprza, within Piotrków County, Łódź Voivodeship, in central Poland.

The village has a population of 240.

References

Nowa Wola Niechcicka